Trachypepla aspidephora is a species of moth in the family Oecophoridae. It is endemic to New Zealand and has been observed in the North and South Islands. Adults are on the wing from November to March and are attracted to light. The moths can be found resting on tree trunks where their colouration imitates lichens.

Taxonomy 
This species was first described in 1883 by Edward Meyrick and named Trachypepla aspidephora. Later that same year Meyrick gave another abbreviated description of the species. In 1884 Meyrick gave a much fuller description of T. aspidephora. In 1928 George Hudson discussed and illustrated this species. The male lectotype specimen, collected at heir colouration imitated lichens, in the Port Hills of Christchurch, is held at the Natural History Museum, London.

Description
Meyrick described the adults of this species as follows:

Distribution

This species is endemic to New Zealand and has been collected in the North and South Islands. T. aspidephora has been observed in Kaeo in Northland, Auckland, Wellington, Nelson, Mount Arthur, Christchurch, Dunedin and Invercargill.

Behaviour
Adults of this species are on the wing from November to March. Hudson noted that the adults were frequently found resting on tree trunks and that their colouration imitated lichens. Adult moths are attracted to light.

References 

Moths described in 1883
Oecophorinae
Moths of New Zealand
Endemic fauna of New Zealand
Taxa named by Edward Meyrick
Endemic moths of New Zealand